Pârvu III Cantacuzino, also known as Pârvul, Părvul, Purvul or Pîrvu Cantacuzino (Pyrvu Matveyevich Kantakuzino; ? – December 11 or 15, 1769), was a high-ranking Wallachian statesman who served intermittently as Spatharios  and Ban of Oltenia, primarily known as the leader of an anti-Ottoman rebellion. Holding sway over a Russophile faction within the Wallachian boyardom, he briefly served as an officer in Russia's Imperial Army during the Russo-Turkish War of 1768-1774. Pârvu was a member of the Cantacuzino family, which made him a descendant of several Wallachian Princes, and was joined in all of his political and military actions by his younger brothers, the Vistier Mihai and Clucer Răducanu Cantacuzino.

Exiled by Prince Matei Ghica in the early 1750s, Pârvu and Mihai became known for their protests against the abuses of Phanariote rulers and their retinue. They experienced success, then imprisonment, under Constantin Racoviță, and became highly popular for resisting the tax policies of Ștefan Racoviță. Helping Pyotr Rumyantsev and Nazary Alexandrovych Karazin in their occupation of Bucharest, the Cantacuzinos also arrested Grigore III Ghica; in the aftermath, Pârvu served as civilian governor of Wallachia. He commanded a part of the Wallachian military forces, which he reorganized around voluntary units, whose commanders included Sofronie of Cioara. Assisting against the Ottoman army on the road to Giurgiu, Pârvu and his Jäger infantry were ambushed and killed on the way to Comana Monastery, which became their burial place.

Pârvu may have contributed to the Cantacuzinos' impact on Romanian culture as the uncredited author of a historical chronicle that was plagiarized by Naum Râmniceanu. His family branch, headed by Mihai, survived mostly in exile, joining the ranks of Russian nobility and calling for Wallachia's annexation to Russia. It included Pârvu's nephew Ioan Cantacuzino, the poet and politician, who returned for a while to take over as leader of the Russophile faction. The Russophiles maintained a presence in Wallachian politics to ca. 1800, but frictions between the Empire and the boyars pushed the party a steady decline.

Biography

Origins and rise
The Cantacuzinos were a family of Greek refugees, though probably related, through their patriarch Andronikos Kantakouzenos, with the local late-16th-century Prince, Michael the Brave. Their exact relationship with the original Kantakouzenos, from whom they claimed descent, remains disputed. Pârvu and Mihai descended directly from Drăghici Cantacuzino, brother of Șerban Cantacuzino, who was Prince in the 1680s, and of the scholar-politician Constantin II. Drăghici, his brother Șerban, and their father, Constantin I Cantacuzino had been involved in various schemes during the 1650s and '60s, culminating in open conflict with Prince Grigore I Ghica. The latter ordered Constantin I hanged at Snagov Monastery, and mutilated Șerban. This prompted Drăghici to take refuge in Istanbul. He died there in 1667, either from the plague outbreak or (as it was rumored) from poison administered by the boyar Nicula Sofialiul. Through this connection, Pârvu was also a maternal descendant of Prince Radu Șerban and of the high-ranking courtier Diicul Buicescul.

Pârvu hailed from the "Măgureanu" Cantacuzinos, whose origin is traced to one of Drăghici's sons, also named Pârvu (or Pârvu II). This prominent boyar and diplomat under several Princes married Ilinca, daughter of Mareș Băjescu, the Ban of Oltenia. The couple's youngest son, Matei, also served as Ban in 1735–1740. From his marriage to the boyaress Păuna (Pagona) Rustea, he had a daughter, Maria, and four sons, of whom Pârvu III was second. Constantin, the eldest, left for Moldavia in 1733, establishing a Cantacuzino branch there before his death in 1761. Remaining in Wallachia, Pârvu, Mihai and their youngest brother, Răducanu, went on to occupy high offices of the court. 

The Cantacuzino brothers' political ascendancy came at the height of a Phanariote regime, when Princes were directly appointed by, and subservient to, the Sublime Porte. According to historian Neagu Djuvara, the Cantacuzinos were technically Phanariotes, but emphasized their matrilineal connection to the House of Basarab. As such, they "would soon come to lead a 'national party', one hostile to the growing influence of the Greeks". Pârvu III's first contribution to the Wallachian military forces came during Constantine Mavrocordatos' third reign (1735–1741). He was ordered to take up arms during the 1737 campaign against Russia; in fact, the army's role was to intervene between the Bucharest populace and the Ottoman army, policing against pillage and rape. This period inaugurated his participation in Russophile politics and intrigues. Appointed Serdar in April 1737, he signed his name to Vornic Preda Drăgănescu's memorandum which requested from Anna Ioannovna, Empress of All Russia, pleading with her to "liberate us [...] by any means". From June, the Habsburg monarchy joined the war as a Russian ally, and invaded Wallachia, prompting the Prince and boyars into exile; several of those still present in Bucharest were arrested by Habsburg General Barkóczy, and deported into Transylvania. Pârvu and his father were among those who signed a letter of protest to the Russians, asking them to curb their allies' abuses. The document was successfully delivered by Dimitrie Scutari at Kiev—along with another memorandum which asked for Wallachia to be made a Russian protectorate.

Pârvu was at the time married to Maria, daughter of a Moldavian boyar, Andronic Palade. The wedding took place on October 28, 1739, in the church outside Curtea Veche, with Prince Mavrocordatos appearing as Pârvu's godfather. Maria died shortly after, in or before 1741. The widower was again active in high politics with the death of Prince Grigore II Ghica in August 1752, when he openly protested against Phanariote abuses as embodied by the deceased. Matei Ghica took the throne before the end of the year, forcing Pârvu and Mihai into exile to Moldavia for almost a year. By 1759, Pârvu had married Elena (or Eleni) Hrisoscoleu, making him in-laws with Serdar Canache.

Moving from Moldavia to Wallachia in 1753, Prince Constantin Racoviță took the Cantacuzino brothers with him to Bucharest, and reinstated Pârvu as a Paharnic in 1753, and advancing Mihai (married into the Văcărescu family) as his trusted treasurer, or Vistier. By 1761, with Mavrocordatos again on the throne, Pârvu was serving as the highest-ranking Logothete. In October of that year, he and his relative, the Medelnicer Toma Cantacuzino, exchanged property in Bucharest, making Pârvu owner of the "parental homes" in Șerban-Vodă mahala—located outside Lipscani, and named after their ancestor, the Prince. This acquisition included the Șerban's wooden chapel, which Pârvu rebuilt out of brick, and which went as dowry to his daughter Maria. Mihai Cantacuzino was also an amateur historian, and there is indication that Pârvu also authored at least one work in the field. Scholars have deduced the existence of Istoria Țării Românești ("History of Wallachia") as a manuscript dating back to 1763, and have attributed it to Pârvu.

Racoviță returned on the throne in 1763, by which time the brothers had a running feud with Stavrachi, who was princely representative to the Sublime Porte. As a result of his intrigues, both Mihai and Pârvu were imprisoned in Bucharest, but simply released by the Bucharest populace upon the Prince's death in January 1764. Mihai could return as Vistier under Ștefan Racoviță (1764–1765), but only after proving himself capable of increasing the fiscal revenue by some 7,200 bags of gold. He was again imprisoned, alongside nine other boyars, when he refused to apply the dreaded tax on chimneys. This abuse caused another burghers' revolt in Bucharest, prompting Sultan Mustafa III to intervene; Prince Ștefan hurried to release Mihai and the others, but was still garrotted for his insubordination. Even before he could take his throne as Racoviță's replacement, Scarlat Ghica made Pârvu his Logothete, reconfirming Mihai as Vistier. Under his successor Alexandru Ghica, Pârvu went on to serve command offices in the military, as Oltenian Ban, and was also curator of Pantelimon Hospital, alongside Badea Știrbei. In 1767, he married a third and final time to another Palade boyaress, Smaranda (or Esmeralda), who was also the granddaughter of Moldavian Prince Antioh Cantemir. Răducanu, meanwhile, served as a Clucer, marrying Caterina, daughter of John Mavrocordatos.

Revolt and death
The Cantacuzinos' role in fomenting insurrection was more evident from once Grigore III Ghica took the throne in 1768. In that context, he protected monk Sofronie of Cioara, who had led the peasants of neighboring Transylvania in their revolt against serfdom and Greek Catholicism. With Pârvu's support, Sofronie began recruiting Transylvanians, Wallachians and Moldavians, preparing his return into the Apuseni Mountains. Shortly before the Russo-Turkish War began in October 1768, Pârvu and his brother formed a group of pro-Russian boyars in Bucharest. Their connection with the Russians was a Polkovnik Nazary Alexandrovych Karazin (father of Vasyl Karazin). Karazin, who feigned illness and was hospitalized at Argeș Monastery, handed manifestos to the brothers, which they were to distribute in Wallachia and the Sanjak of Smederevo. Another immediate task was to channel a constant flow of Wallachian volunteers to enforce the Russian flank from incursions by the Budjak Horde and Silistra Eyalet. In January 1769, Bucharest was raided by rogue Ottoman troops, which pillaged through several neighborhoods. In May, this unlawful action was the object of a formal inquiry by Prince Ghica and Judge Esseid Elias of Giurgiu.

While engaged in the Karazin conspiracy, Pârvu still enjoyed Ghica's trust, and, early in the war, was confirmed as Ban and Spatharios of the Wallachian army. Karazin presented the Cantacuzinos with a manifesto by Empress Catherine the Great, promising to free the Danubian Principalities and the Balkans from the "barbarians' domination". As a sign of favor, the Russians presented Pârvu with a medal bearing her likeness. By then, the "Russian" party was also supported by burghers and commoners, who resented the Phanariote and Ottoman fiscal policies. These, alongside boyars who embraced the cause of "Holy Rus", numbered in the thousands—according to Djuvara, some 12,000 men from Wallachia and Moldavia migrated to Russia and joined the imperial army. In January 1769, with the Russians having taken Moldavia, the Orthodox Church of Wallachia sent a letter to the Empress, asking for their country to be occupied as well. At around that same date, Catherine wrote to Cantacuzino personally. Her reply referred to the Wallachians as a "Slavic people"—according to historian Nicolae Iorga and political scientist Dumitru Th. Pârvu, hers is the earliest record of Pan-Slavism being tested on the locals.

For several months, Karazin's mixed force did not venture out of Moldavia, and remained based at Focșani. Bucharest was pacified by the Ottomans during spring 1769, when the Ottoman army again set up a direct presence. Following its acts of violence against Bucharest civilians, and aware that the Turkish garrison was undermanned, Pârvu created his own volunteer army of Romanians and Arnavutlar (Albanians), joined by some of Karazin's Zaporozhian Cossacks; in the early hours of November 16, these troops ambushed the Ottomans and arrested Prince Grigore. According to various records, including his brother's Genealogia Cantacuzinilor, this victory was in fact obtained by a Moldavian Polkovnik, Ilie Lăpușneanu; Mihai Cantacuzino additionally emphasizes Prince Ghica's tacit cooperation with the Russians. Records kept by chronicler Necolai Piteșteanul also note Sofronie's participation in the events, as one who escorted Karazin's men on their way in from Focșani. A rhyming chronicle for 1769 further suggests that Lăpușneanu and Sofronie presented themselves as judges on behalf of the people, proceeding to persecute Bucharest's Jews and Armenians.

Some 5,000 Ottoman soldiers were chased out of the capital, but only as far as Giurgiu, where they recuperated. Following this move, a group of Wallachian boyars addressed Catherine a letter in which they asked for Wallachia to be annexed as a guberniya. Genealogist Eugène Rizo-Rangabé further notes that Pârvu was made the civilian "Governor of Wallachia" by General Pyotr Rumyantsev; according to Genealogia, he was using the title of Ban, extended to Wallachia as a whole—Ștefan Topliceanu took over as Spatharios. Pârvu then appealed to his in-law, Ienăchiță Văcărescu, who was to obtain for him the submission of the Boyar Council. Văcărescu, the alleged author of a patriotic hymn used by Russia to recruit among the Wallachians, was subsequently dispatched to Buzău County, but used the opportunity to cross the border into neutral Transylvania. As he recalled in his memoirs, he felt pressured by Karazin, and would not commit themselves to the Cantacuzinos' unreserved Russophilia. Reportedly, the Cantacuzinos hoped that Pârvu would take over Ghica's throne. This created additional frictions between the boyars, since Văcărescu wanted the throne for himself. 

A number of setbacks followed the early Russian victory. The Ottomans camped at Giurgiu were reinforced by troops from Ruschuk and other garrisons, and placed under a senior commander, Çelebi Agha. This force began marching on Bucharest; Karazin's volunteers, sent to meet them, were defeated and had to barricade themselves in Comana Monastery. Placed in command of a small Russian detachment and a unit of Verzișori or Egheri (Wallachian Jäger), Pârvu Cantacuzino promised to relieve them. He was ambushed by Ottoman troops in Vlăsiei forest, outside Comana. He was killed in the battle of December 11 or December 15 alongside most of his men, including a Russian Major by the name of Andreh and the Verzișori Captain Șerban Lăcusteanu. Some 1,000 soldiers are believed to have been killed on the anti-Ottoman side. Contemporary accounts suggest that only three of Pârvu's Egheri survived the massacre, all of them ending up as Ottoman slaves. 

However, the Comana ambush became a Russian tactical victory: the Ottoman soldiers, believing that they would not be able to confront a stream of Russian new arrivals, backed out of the confrontation and returned to Giurgiu. As reported by Necolai Piteșteanul, they were in fact justified to retreat, since 1,800 Russian grenadiers had been brought in to deal with them. Pârvu's body was recovered by his followers and taken to the nearby monastery. Although the latter had been damaged during the fighting, it was incidentally a traditional Cantacuzino burial site. Pârvu's remains were placed in the tomb of his maternal ancestor, Radu Șerban.

Legacy
Răducanu Cantacuzino took over as Wallachian military commander shortly after his brother's death, having been recognized as such by Nikolai Vasilyeich Repnin. A new Ottoman-appointed Prince, Emanuel Giani Ruset, tried to occupy Bucharest at various intervals from January 1770, ultimately succeeding in June, when the Russians operated a strategic retreat; in August, a large-scale Ottoman defeat at Kagul led to a Russian return, and to the peace of Küçük Kaynarca. Mihai Cantacuzino was appointed Ban by Russian general Ivan Gudovich in November 1770. He was consequently involved in the treaty negotiations, addressing a memorandum in which he outlined the Wallachian grievances and demanded the preservation of autonomy from Ottoman rule, claiming that it had been codified by medieval Capitulations. 

The resulting treaty gave Russia sweeping powers of intervention in Wallachian public life, and also offered a general amnesty to Russian favorites, who were allowed to preserve their mobile wealth but had to leave the country. The latter clause was used by Mihai, who settled in Russia, becoming a Major General. He also remained an avid campaigner for the Russian annexation of Wallachia and Moldavia. By 1775, he had donated his immobile estate for charity, establishing a Romanian-language school on the grounds of Livedea Văcărescului (Filaret) Church, Bucharest. He still corresponded with his sister-in-law Smaranda, who may also have intended to settle in Russia by 1776, but ultimately renounced due to her failing health. She died childless and impoverished in Moldavia, at some point between 1791 and 1794. Pârvu's daughter from another marriage, Maria, married in 1770 or 1774 the Moldavian Vornic Teodor Balș Bozianul (1743–1810). A widower, he donated Pârvu's Bucharest homes and his chapel to the Wallachian Church, and also made his way to Russia. 

Mihai died in his Russian exile in 1790, having been recognized as an imperial prince. He had four daughters, one of whom had married Alexey Petrovich, son of Pyotr Melissino. In some records, Răducanu appears as having died serving in the war; other sources note his fleeing to the Russian side, and then with his brother to Russia, where he became a Polkovnik. Their two sons, Nicolae and Ioan Cantacuzino, also took flight and were educated at Russian military schools. Their Cantacuzino branch founded the village of Kantakuzinka (now Prybuzhany, in the Ukraine). The cause of "Holy Rus" was still represented in Wallachia by a former 1769 volunteer of Aromanian descent, Dimitrie Varlam, and by Pârvu's returning nephews, Ioan and Nicolae. Nevertheless, Djuvara notes, Russophile enthusiasm in Wallachia declined steadily, especially following the renewed occupation of 1787, making the Russian party "weakest" among all boyar factions by 1800. Of Pârvu's nephews, Ioan endorsed the Austrian occupation of 1789; he also flirted with republicanism, circulating a reform project giving executive powers to the Boyar Council. Withdrawn to Kantakuzinka following disappointment in the war, he started his second career, as a Romanian-language poet and translator of Western literature.

According to scholar Constantin Rezachevici, Pârvu's killing and burial custom can be used as clues in tracing the tomb of a 15th-century Prince, Vlad the Impaler, which may also have been located at Comana. It was later recorded as răzbelul de la Comana ("war of Comana"); the section of the forest were Cantacuzino fell was baptized la bătaia mare a verzișorilor ("Great Battleground of the Verzișori"). Pârvu Cantacuzino's attributed work of historiography survives only in a manuscript copy by Naum Râmniceanu, which belonged to Transylvanian intellectual Timotei Cipariu. Râmniceanu plagiarized the text by failing to credit its author, but without noting that Cantacuzino was still identified in an acrostic and chronogram, which were only described in 1992.

Notes

References
Marieta Chiper, "Pârvu Cantacuzino – un nume nou în istoriografie?", in Magazin Istoric, February 1992, pp. 18–21.
Neagu Djuvara, Între Orient și Occident. Țările române la începutul epocii moderne. Bucharest: Humanitas, 1995.  
Dan Dumitrașcu, "Participarea românilor la războiul ruso-turc din 1768–1774 și începutul formării armatei naționale", in Cetatea de Scaun. Revista Profesorilor de Istorie din Județul Suceava, Vol. 8, Issue 8, 2011, pp. 74–77.
Radu Economu, "Călugărul Sofronie de la Cioara în Țara Românească", in Biserica Ortodoxă Română, Vol. CX, Issues 1–3, January–March 1992, pp. 94–99.
Andrei Eșanu et al., Dinastia Cantemireștilor (sec. XVII–XVIII). Chișinău: Academy of Sciences of Moldova & Editura Știința, 2008.  
George D. Florescu, "Planuri inedite ale Bucureștilor la sfârșitul secolului al XVIII-lea", in Revista Fundațiilor Regale, Vol. I, Issue 3, March 1934, pp. 572–603.
Constantin C. Giurescu, Istoria Bucureștilor. Din cele mai vechi timpuri pînă în zilele noastre. Bucharest: Editura pentru literatură, 1966.  
Nicolae Iorga, Ceva despre ocupațiunea austriacă în anii 1789—1791. Bucharest etc.: Librăriile Socec & Comp. etc., 1911.
Grigore Lăcusteanu (contributor: Radu Crutzescu), Amintirile colonelului Lăcusteanu. Text integral, editat după manuscris. Iași: Polirom, 2015.  
Alexandru Lapedatu, "Mănăstirea Comana", in Buletinul Comisiunii Monumentelor Istorice, Vol. I, January–March 1908, pp. 9–23.
 Efim Levit, "Recuperări. Ioan Cantacuzino", in Noua Revistă Filologică, Vol. III, Issues 1–2, 2012, pp. 30–42.
Dumitru Th. Pârvu, Problema Basarabiei în lumina principiilor actelor juridice internaționale. Contribuții la cunoaşterea raporturilor diplomatice româno–ruse. Bucharest: Editura Bibliotecii Metropolitane, 2013.  
Giorge Pascu, "Mihail Cantacuzino", in Cercetări Istorice, Vol. I, Issue 1, 1925, pp. 66–78.
Constantin Rezachevici, "Unde a fost mormântul lui Vlad Țepeș?", in Magazin Istoric: Part I, February 2002, pp. 10–15; Part II, March 2002, pp. 41–46.
Eugène Rizo-Rangabé, Livre d'or de la noblesse phanariote en Grèce, en Roumanie, en Russie et en Turquie. Athens: S. C. Vlastos, 1892.  
H. Dj. Siruni, "O năvălire necunoscută a bandelor turcești în Țările Române la 1769. După documente turcești din Arhivele Statului", in Revista Arhivelor, Vol. IV, Issue 1, 1940, pp. 6–68.
N. Stoicescu, Dicționar al marilor dregători din Țara Românească și Moldova. Sec. XIV–XVII. Bucharest: Editura enciclopedică, 1971.  
Victor Taki, "Limits of Protection: Russia and the Orthodox Coreligionists in the Ottoman Empire", The Carl Beck Papers in Russian and East European Studies, Number 2401, April 2015.
Mircea Tănase, Mihail Muscariu, "Comana – o mănăstire cetate la sud de București", in Monumentul, XII: Lucrările Simpozionului Național Monumentul – Tradiție și Viitor, 2010, pp. 239–268.
N. A. Ursu, "Ioan Cantacuzino", in Alexandru Dima, Ion C. Chițimia, Paul Cornea, Eugen Todoran (eds.), Istoria literaturii române. II: De la Școala Ardeleană la Junimea, pp. 180–183. Bucharest: Editura Academiei, 1968
Ienăchiță Văcărescu (contributor: Gabriel Ștrempel), Istoria othomanicească. Bucharest: Editura Biblioteca Bucureștilor, 2001.  
Al. Vianu, "Din acțiunea diplomatică a Țării Romînești în Rusia în anii 1736—1738", in Romanoslavica, Vol. VIII, 1963, pp. 19–26.

18th-century births
Year of birth unknown
1769 deaths
18th-century Romanian people
18th-century politicians
18th-century soldiers
Bans of Oltenia
Logothetes of Wallachia
Spatharii of Wallachia
Serdari of Wallachia
Regents and governors of Wallachia
Romanian hospital administrators
Parvu
History of Bucharest
Romanian rebels
18th-century military personnel from the Russian Empire
Military personnel of the Russian Empire killed in action
18th-century Romanian writers
18th-century Romanian poets
Moldavian and Wallachian chroniclers